Archanara geminipuncta, the twin-spotted wainscot, is a moth of the family Noctuidae which is found in Europe, Lebanon, Israel, Turkey, Iraq and the Caucasus. The species was first described by Adrian Hardy Haworth in 1809.

Technical description and variation

A. geminipuncta Haw. (= guttans Hbn., paludicola Hbn. f. 637, arundinis Sepp.) (49 g). Forewing reddish fuscous, with a broad paler space along the inner margin; the reniform stigma with two white spots; hindwing fuscous; the ground colour is very variable; — in ab. pallida Tutt it is reddish-or greyish ochreous; in rufa Tutt uniform reddish brown; and in nigricans Stgr. (= fusca Tutt) (49 g) sooty-black; from another point of view, the reniform stigma may contain, only one, — the lower, — white spot, or neither; ab. unipuncta Tutt (49 h) and ab. obsoleta Tutt (49 g) respectively; ab. paludicola Hbn. f. 624, if the figure is not exaggerated, represents a dark reddish brown specimen, with the median and costal veins white; a small black orbicular stigma and large black reniform with a white lunule on its inner edge; and all the veins white before termen; the hindwing grey, with paler base and a dark cellspot. Larva pinkish ochreous; the spiracular line paler; head dark brown.
 Its wingspan is 27–32 mm.

Biology
The moth flies from June to October depending on location. The larvae feed on Phragmites species.

References

External links

 
Lenisa geminipuncta at Fauna Europaea
 Lepidoptera of Belgium
 Lenisa geminipuncta at Lepiforum e.V.
 De Vlinderstichting 

Acronictinae
Moths described in 1809
Moths of Europe
Moths of the Middle East
Moths of Asia
Taxa named by Adrian Hardy Haworth